The Arado Ar 79 was a German aircraft of the 1930s, designed as an aerobatic two-seat trainer and touring aircraft.

The Ar 79 was a monoplane with retractable, tailwheel undercarriage. The wings were constructed of fabric over plywood, the forward fuselage was of fabric over steel tube, and the rear fuselage was a monocoque structure.

Operational history
The Ar 79 set a number of speed records in 1938:
On 15 July the solo 1,000 km (621.4 mi) at 229.04 km/h (142.32 mph),
On 29 July the 2,000 km (1,242.8 mi) at 227.029 km/h (141.069 mph).
From 29 to 31 December, a modified Ar 79, with a jettisonable 106 L (28 US gal) fuel tank and extra 520 L (140 US gal) tank behind the cabin, completed a non-stop 6,303 km (3,917 mi) flight from Benghazi, Libya to Gaya, India, at an average speed of 160 km/h (100 mph).

Operators

Royal Hungarian Air Force

Specifications

Notes

References

External links

Clipwings.com video of restored Arado Ar 79B

Single-engined tractor aircraft
Low-wing aircraft
1930s German military trainer aircraft
Ar 079
Aircraft first flown in 1938